Group C of EuroBasket 2017 consisted of , , , ,  and . The games were played between 1 and 7 September 2017. All games were played at the Polyvalent Hall in Cluj-Napoca, Romania.

Standings

All times are local (UTC+3).

Matches

Hungary v Croatia

Spain v Montenegro

Romania v Czech Republic

Montenegro v Hungary

Czech Republic v Spain

Croatia v Romania

Hungary v Czech Republic

Montenegro v Croatia

Spain v Romania

Czech Republic v Montenegro

Croatia v Spain

Romania v Hungary

Czech Republic v Croatia

Hungary v Spain

Montenegro v Romania

References

Group C
International basketball competitions hosted by Romania
2017–18 in Croatian basketball
2017–18 in Czech basketball
2017–18 in Spanish basketball
2017–18 in Montenegrin basketball
2017–18 in Romanian basketball
2017–18 in Hungarian basketball
Sport in Cluj-Napoca